The following is the list of squads that took part in the men's water polo tournament at the 1920 Summer Olympics.

Belgium
The following players represented Belgium:

 Albert Durant
 Paul Gailly
 Pierre Nijs
 Joseph Pletinckx
 Maurice Blitz
 René Bauwens
 Gérard Blitz
 Pierre Dewin

Brazil
The following players represented Brazil:

 Orlando Amêndola
 Agostinho Sampaio de Sá
 Victorino Ramos Fernandes
 Ângelo Gammaro
 João Jório
 Alcides Paiva
 Abrahão Saliture
 Edgard Leite

Czechoslovakia
The following players represented Czechoslovakia:

 František Franěk
 Antonín Novotný
 Václav Lancinger
 Eduard Stibor
 Hugo Sedláček
 Emil Cirl
 František Černík
 Jan Hora

France
The following players represented France:

 Jean Thorailler
 Émile-Georges Drigny
 Albert Mayaud
 Henri Padou
 Henri Duvanel
 Marcel Hussaud
 Paul Vasseur

Great Britain
The following players represented Great Britain:

 Charles Smith
 Noel Purcell
 Chris Jones
 Charles Bugbee
 Billy Dean
 Paul Radmilovic
 Bill Peacock

Greece
The following players represented Greece:

 Pantelis Psychas
 Andreas Asimakopoulos
 Georgios Pilavakhis
 Konstantinos Nikolopoulos
 Mikes Tsamis
 Aristidis Rousias
 Savvas Mavridis
 Dionysios Vasilopoulos
 Nikolaos Baltatzis-Mavrokordatos

Italy
The following players represented Italy:

 Salvatore Cabella
 Ercole Boero
 Amilcare Beretta
 Luigi Burlando
 Achille Olivari
 Umberto Lungavia
 Mario Boero
 Angelo Vassallo

Netherlands
The following players represented the Netherlands:

 Karel Struijs
 Karel Kratz
 Karel Meijer
 George Cortlever
 Piet Plantinga
 Gé Bohlander
 Jean van Silfhout
 Piet van der Velden
 Leen Hoogendijk

Spain
The following players represented Spain:

 Luis Gibert
 Alfonso Tusell
 Ramón Berdomás
 Manuel Armanqué
 Antonio Vila-Coro
 Francisco Gibert
 Enrique Granados
 José Fontanet

Sweden
The following players represented Sweden:

 Theodor Nauman
 Pontus Hanson
 Max Gumpel
 Torsten Kumfeldt
 Vilhelm Andersson
 Nils Backlund
 Robert Andersson
 Erik Andersson
 Harald Julin
 Erik Bergqvist

Switzerland
The following players represented Switzerland:

 Albert Mondet
 Charles Biefer
 Charles Horn
 Henri Demiéville
 Jean Jenni
 Armand Boppart
 René Ricolfi-Doria

United States
The following players represented the United States:

 Preston Steiger
 Sophus Jensen
 Mike McDermott
 Clement Browne
 Herb Vollmer
 Harry Hebner
 James Carson
 William Vosburgh
 Herbert Taylor
 Perry McGillivray
 Duke Kahanamoku
 Norman Ross

References

1920